Rah Daneh (also Romanized as Rāh Dāneh; also known as Rāh Dahaneh) is a village in Beygom Qaleh Rural District, in the Central District of Naqadeh County, West Azerbaijan Province, Iran. At the 2006 census, its population was 681, in 177 families.

References 

Populated places in Naqadeh County